Big Whiteshell Lake is located within the Whiteshell Provincial Park in southeastern Manitoba, Canada.

The route from Rennie to Big Whiteshell Lake was originally constructed in the thirties, when workers from the Manitoba Home for Boys at Portage Le. Prairie attempted to cut a road through the Whiteshell Forest Reserve from Rennie to Green Lake. Further development of the lake and surrounding shoreline began in 1957, when the Manitoba Scout Association began looking for a larger campsite to accommodate their growing number of scouts. The provincial government offered a  tract of land at the southern end of Big Whiteshell Lake, and Camp Alloway was established.  The lake is a popular local tourist destination for fishing, hiking, and other summer activities.  Manitoba entertainer Larry Clark, better known under his pseudonym Uncle Smokey, composed several novelty campfire songs while working in a fire lookout tower on Big Whiteshell Lake.

References 

Lakes of Manitoba
Whiteshell Provincial Park
Bodies of water of Eastman Region, Manitoba